The 1950–51 Rugby Football League season was the 56th season of rugby league football.

Season summary
Workington Town won their first, and to date, only Championship when they beat Warrington 26-11 in the play-off final. Warrington had finished the regular season as the league leaders.

The Challenge Cup Winners were Wigan who beat Barrow 10-0 in the final.

Warrington won the Lancashire League, and Leeds won the Yorkshire League. Wigan beat Warrington 28–5 to win the Lancashire County Cup, and Huddersfield beat Castleford 16–3 to win the Yorkshire County Cup.

Championship

Play-offs

Challenge Cup

Wigan beat Barrow 10–0 in the final played at Wembley in front of a crowd of 94,262. This was Wigan's fourth Cup Final win in nine Final appearances. It was also the third successive final that the losing team had failed to score. Cec Mountford, Wigan's stand-off half back was awarded the Lance Todd Trophy for man-of-the-match.

European Championship

This was the eleventh European Championships and was won for the third time by France on points difference.

Results

Final standings

Sources
 1950-51 Rugby Football League season at wigan.rlfans.com
 The Challenge Cup at The Rugby Football League website

References

1950 in English rugby league
1951 in English rugby league
Northern Rugby Football League seasons